Sofyan Amrabat (born 21 August 1996) is a Dutch-Moroccan professional footballer who plays as a midfielder for Serie A club Fiorentina and the Morocco national team.

A youth product of Utrecht, Amrabat made his senior career debut in 2014. In 2017, he signed for Dutch rivals Feyenoord, where he would win the KNVB Cup and two Johan Cruyff Shields. The following year, Amrabat moved to Belgium with Club Brugge. In 2019, he signed for Italian club Hellas Verona on loan with an option-to-buy; the club eventually bought him in January 2020, sold him to Fiorentina, and loaned him back in for the remainder of the 2019–20 season.

Born in the Netherlands, Amrabat represented his birth country at youth international level in 2010 before switching allegiance to Morocco in 2013. He made his senior Morocco debut in 2017, and has since represented the country at two FIFA World Cups and one Africa Cup of Nations tournament.

Club career
Starting his senior career at Utrecht in 2014, Amrabat moved to Feyenoord in 2017. After one season, he joined Club Brugge, before being sent on loan to Italy at Hellas Verona in 2019.

On 31 January 2020, Hellas Verona exercised their option to purchase his rights from Club Brugge and immediately re-sold them to Fiorentina. In return, Fiorentina loaned him back to Verona until the end of the 2019–20 season.

International career

Netherlands youth team
Amrabat was born in the Netherlands to parents of Moroccan descent. He first represented the Netherlands at under-15 level.

Morocco
Amrabat was selected with the Morocco U17 national team for the 2013 FIFA U-17 World Cup.

On 28 March 2017, Amrabat made his senior debut for the Morocco national team in a 1–0 friendly win over Tunisia. In May 2018, he was named in Morocco's 23-man squad for the 2018 FIFA World Cup in Russia.

On 10 November 2022, Amrabat was named in Morocco's 26-man squad for the 2022 FIFA World Cup in Qatar. On 6 December 2022, he had a strong performance against Spain, keeping control of the ball in dangerous positions and performing crucial tackles to knock Spain out of the World Cup, which led to an increase of interest for his services across Europe.

Personal life
Sofyan is the younger brother of former Morocco international Nordin Amrabat.

Career statistics

Club

International

Honours
Feyenoord
KNVB Cup: 2017–18
Johan Cruyff Shield: 2017, 2018
Club Brugge
Belgian First Division A: 2019–20

Individual
Eredivisie Player of the Month: November 2017
Hellas Verona Player of the Season: 2019–20
Gazzetta dello Sport Best African Player in Serie A: 2020
IFFHS Africa Team of The Year: 2022
Orders
Order of the Throne: 2022

References

External links

Profile at the ACF Fiorentina website 

1996 births
Living people
People from Huizen
Citizens of Morocco through descent
Moroccan footballers
Morocco international footballers
Morocco youth international footballers
Dutch footballers
Dutch sportspeople of Moroccan descent
Riffian people
Association football midfielders
Eredivisie players
Belgian Pro League players
Serie A players
FC Utrecht players
Feyenoord players
Club Brugge KV players
Hellas Verona F.C. players
ACF Fiorentina players
Moroccan expatriate footballers
Dutch expatriate footballers
Expatriate footballers in Belgium
Expatriate footballers in Italy
Moroccan expatriate sportspeople in Belgium
Dutch expatriate sportspeople in Belgium
Moroccan expatriate sportspeople in Italy
Dutch expatriate sportspeople in Italy
Netherlands youth international footballers
2018 FIFA World Cup players
2021 Africa Cup of Nations players
2022 FIFA World Cup players
Footballers from North Holland
Berber Moroccans